The 1989 African Men's Handball Championship was the eighth edition of the African Men's Handball Championship, held in Algiers, Algeria, from 17 to 27 July 1989. It acted as the African qualifying tournament for the 1990 World Championship in Czechoslovakia.

In the final, Algeria win their fifth consecutive title beating Egypt in the final game 18–17.

Qualified teams

Group stage

Group A

Group B

Knockout stage

Semifinals

Third place game

Final

Final ranking

References

African handball championships
Handball
A
Handball
Handball in Algeria
20th century in Algiers
July 1989 sports events in Africa